Since the Vietnam War, most of Vietnamese vessels were supplied by the Soviet Union and presently by Russia, while hundreds more were integrated into the navy after it was left over from South Vietnam although many have been decommissioned due to lack of parts. However, due to rising tensions in the South China Sea, many nearby nations such as Japan have shown support in developing Vietnam's Navy and Coast Guard.

The Vietnam People's Navy is the branch of the Vietnam People's Army with the fastest modernization as the Vietnamese government put it as a main priority, with constant improvement to its weapons, munitions and combat capability.

Vessels

Aircraft

Munitions

Soldier's equipment

Gear

Firearms

Vehicles

Artillery

Former

Procurement
As the Vietnam People's Navy is responsible for protecting the nation's sovereignty and economic activities at sea, as well to repulse unauthorised foreign vessels intruding into Vietnamese waters, Vietnam's policy has considered the modernisation of the Navy a priority task in the overall military modernisation plan. As stated on 5 August 2011 by Minister of Defence Phùng Quang Thanh:

 Frigates and corvettes: Two s were laid down in 2011 by the Zelenodolsk shipyard in Russia, named HQ-011 Dinh Tien Hoang and HQ-012 Lý Thái Tổ, and two more were ordered. A contract was made in 2011 with Schelde Naval Shipbuilding in the Netherlands to build two s in the Netherlands and two more in Vietnam. The Vietnam People's Navy has itself built six s (Molniya class) with Russian supervision and has designed and built the first warships of the TT-400TP gunboat class.
 Submarines: Vietnam deployed its first submarine flotilla, Flotilla 182, on 1 June 1982. This flotilla was trained in Cam Ranh Bay under the guidance of Soviet submarine officers and used North Korea's . In April 2011, Vietnam ordered six s worth about 1.8 billion dollars, said to be the entire defence budget of Vietnam in 2009. With six submarines, the first to be delivered in 2012 and the last one to be delivered by 2016, Vietnam will own the largest and most modern submarines in Southeast Asia.
 Offshore patrol vessel: When Vietnamese Prime Minister Nguyễn Tấn Dũng visited India in October 2014 it was announced that India will supply 4 naval vessels to Vietnam, and quickly operationalise a $100 million line of credit which will allow Vietnam to purchase new vessels from India.
 Naval air force: The Vietnam People's Navy prepared to build the Naval Air Force to increase the capacity of coastal defence. On 27 February 2010, the Vietnamese People's Army General Staff decided to build and make the 954th Naval Air Force Regiment a regular member of the Vietnamese Navy. Vietnam has purchased three CASA C-212 Aviocar Series 400 aircraft. The aircraft are equipped with MSS 6000 radar and the Naval Air Force will use them for general patrol purposes. Vietnamese Navy received two Eurocopter EC225 Super Puma to offshore patrol and search and rescue missions. Viking Air Company of Canada contracted to sell to Vietnam six Seaplane DHC-6 Twin Otter Series 400 aircraft from 2012 to 2014. While eight Kamov Ka-28 helicopters also transferred to the naval air force.
 Coastal defence missile force: Vietnam People's Navy is building a coastal defence missile force (the 679th Coastal Missile Regiment) to become a core force in its maritime security strategy, with Russian and Indian missile systems. The Vietnamese Navy has already produced for itself the P-5 Pyatyorka/Shaddock anti-ship missile, with a range of 550 km. Vietnam was the only customer to which the Soviet Union exported this missile system. The then Russia delivered two K-300P Bastion-P coastal defence systems to Vietnam. The Bastion system uses the P-800 Oniks/Yakhont supersonic anti-ship missile, primarily used to attack targets on land and sea, has an attack range of 300 km, and can be used to protect a coastline of over 600 km. During a 2014 visit of Vietnamese Prime Minister Nguyễn Tấn Dũng to India, the Indian government under Prime Minister Narendra Modi showed willingness to sell their BrahMos supersonic cruise missiles developed by the Russia-India joint venture BrahMos Aerospace Private Limited to Vietnam. The Vietnamese are now starting to locally produce the anti-ship missile Kh-35 Uran-E after receiving 33 missiles in 2010.

See also
 Vietnam People's Navy

References

Military equipment of Vietnam
People's Army of Vietnam
Vietnam